Kristian Klinck (born 1979) is a German teacher and politician of the Social Democratic Party (SPD) who has been serving as member of the Bundestag for Plön – Neumünster since the 2021 German federal election.

Political career
Klinck became a member of the Bundestag since 2021. He defeated Melanie Bernstein from the Christian Democratic Union. 

In parliament, Klinck serves on the Defence Committee. In addition to his committee assignments, he has been part of the German delegation to the Parliamentary Assembly of the Organization for Security and Co-operation in Europe since 2022.

Within his parliamentary group, Klinck belongs to the Parliamentary Left, a left-wing movement.

Other activities
 Education and Science Workers' Union (GEW), Member

Election results

References 

Living people
1979 births
Members of the Bundestag 2021–2025
Members of the Bundestag for the Social Democratic Party of Germany

Members of the Bundestag for Lower Saxony
21st-century German politicians